Isoalloxazine is the structural foundation of flavins such as riboflavin (vitamin B2) and is a heterocyclic compound.  It has a tricyclic structure which means it has three interconnected rings of atoms and is a tautomer of alloxazine. The structure is formed by primary-secondary aromatic o-diamines and they are a high-melting crystalline substance. The R-group is used to attach various flavin groups It has a similar structure to pteridines which has two interconnected rings.  Isoalloxazine was first obtained in 1934 by Richard Kuhn an Austrian-German biochemist and lab mates.

Isoalloxazine ring 

Isoalloxazine rings can exist in different redox and ionization states depending on the chemistry of FMN and FAD associated with it. Using the redox-active isoalloxazine system, FAD and FMN are able to do one and two electron transfer reactions and also be coupled with proton transfers

References 

Heterocyclic compounds with 3 rings
Nitrogen heterocycles
Pteridines